Cryptanthus burle-marxii is a plant species in the genus Cryptanthus. This species is endemic to Brazil.

Cultivars
 Cryptanthus 'Andrew Filadelfia'
 Cryptanthus 'Bonfire'
 Cryptanthus 'Jacob Pondo'
 Cryptanthus 'Mesa Verde'
 Cryptanthus 'Muddy River'
 Cryptanthus 'Rambling Man'
 Cryptanthus 'Salamanca'
 Cryptanthus 'Tundra'

References

BSI Cultivar Registry Retrieved 11 October 2009

burle-marxii
Flora of Brazil